1 Squadron, 1st Squadron or No. 1 Squadron may refer to:

Australia
No. 1 Squadron RAAF
No. 1 Airfield Operations Support Squadron RAAF
No. 1 Security Forces Squadron RAAF

United Kingdom
No. 1 Squadron RFC, Royal Flying Corps
No. 1 Squadron RAF, Royal Air Force
No. 1 Squadron RAF Regiment
No. 1 Squadron RNAS, Royal Naval Air Service
1st Frigate Squadron (United Kingdom)

United States
1st Air and Space Test Squadron
1st Airborne Command Control Squadron
1st Airlift Squadron
1st Combat Communications Squadron
1st Expeditionary Space Control Squadron
1st Fighter Squadron
1st Helicopter Squadron
1st Reconnaissance Squadron
1st Space Control Squadron
1st Space Launch Squadron
1st Space Operations Squadron
1st Special Operations Squadron
VBF-1, Bombing Fighting Squadron One, U.S. Navy
Fighter Plane Squadron 1, VF-1, U.S. Navy
Fighter Squadron 1 (United States Navy), VF-1
Marine Air Control Squadron 1, U.S. Marine Corps
 Destroyer Squadron 1, U.S. Navy
 Submarine Squadron 1, U.S. Navy
Coast Guard Squadron One

Other countries
No. 1 Squadron RNZAF, New Zealand
No. 1 Squadron IAF, India
1 Squadron SAAF, South Africa
1st Squadron (Belgium)
No. 1 Squadron RBAF, Brunei Darussalam